Tom Taylor (1817–1880) was a British dramatist and editor of Punch magazine.

Tom Taylor may also refer to:

 Tom Taylor (actor), English actor known for role in The Dark Tower
 Tom Taylor (American football) (born 1962), American football guard
 Tom Taylor, Baron Taylor of Blackburn (1929–2016), UK Labour politician
 Tom Taylor (billiards player), World Professional Billiards Championship runner-up
 Tom Taylor (cricketer, born 1994), English cricketer for Derbyshire and Leicestershire
 Tom Taylor (English footballer) (born 1985), English footballer
 Tom Taylor (Glamorgan cricketer) (1911–1970), Welsh cricketer
 Tom Taylor (mayor), retired mayor of Newmarket, Ontario
 Tom Taylor (rugby union) (born 1989), New Zealand rugby union footballer
 Tom Taylor (soccer) (1880–1945), 1904 Olympic football (soccer) competitor from Canada
 Tom Taylor (writer) (born 1978), Australian comic book author and screenwriter
 Tom Taylor (Yorkshire cricketer) (1878–1960), English cricketer
 Tex Taylor (baseball) (Tom Taylor, born 1933), baseball player-manager
 Tsquared (Tom Taylor, born 1987), American professional video game player
 Tom Taylor, character in the 2004 film The Altruist

See also
 Thomas Taylor (disambiguation)
 Tommy Taylor (disambiguation)
 Tom Tailor